The 2020–21 Central Connecticut Blue Devils men's basketball team represented Central Connecticut State University during the 2020–21 NCAA Division I men's basketball season. The Blue Devils are led by fifth-year head coach Donyell Marshall, and play their home games at the William H. Detrick Gymnasium in New Britain, Connecticut as members of the Northeast Conference.

Previous season
The Blue Devils finished the 2019–20 season, 4–27, 3–15 in NEC play to finish in last place. They failed to qualify for the NEC tournament.

Roster

Schedule and results

|-
!colspan=12 style=| Regular season

      

   

Source

References

Central Connecticut Blue Devils men's basketball seasons
Central Connecticut Blue Devils
Central Connecticut Blue Devils men's basketball team
Central Connecticut Blue Devils men's basketball team